Omer Tchalisher is an Israeli footballer.

Career
On July 8, 2012, Tchalisher signed a contract with Maccabi Netanya of the Israeli Premier League. In July 2015, he was released from the club and a month later signed with Hapoel Nir Ramat HaSharon in the Liga Leumit. At the middle of the 2015–16 season he moved to Hapoel Ironi Kiryat Shmona.

Club career statistics
(correct as of 1 August 2020)

Honours
Liga Leumit
Winner (1): 2013-14
Israel State Cup
Runner-up (1): 2014

References

1993 births
Living people
Israeli Jews
Israeli footballers
Beitar Nes Tubruk F.C. players
Maccabi Netanya F.C. players
Hapoel Nir Ramat HaSharon F.C. players
Hapoel Ironi Kiryat Shmona F.C. players
Hapoel Afula F.C. players
Hapoel Ramat Gan F.C. players
Hapoel Kfar Saba F.C. players
Hapoel Petah Tikva F.C. players
Hapoel Umm al-Fahm F.C. players
Israel under-21 international footballers
Israeli Premier League players
Liga Leumit players
People from Zikhron Ya'akov
Association football midfielders